Dana McKean Evans (May 19, 1874 – November 28, 1924), commonly known as "Doc" Evans, was an American athlete, coach and athletics administrator.  He played football and baseball at Boston University.  For ten years, he directed the Denver Athletic Club's activities. In 1904, he accepted a position as wrestling, basketball and gymnastics coach at Cornell University.  He was the athletic director and head basketball coach at Beloit College from 1910 to 1914.  He was the head basketball coach at Indiana University (1917–18 through 1918–19 seasons) and Northwestern University (1921–22 season).  He compiled a career record of 46–32 in six seasons as a head basketball coach.  He was also the head track coach at Indiana.  He resigned from his position at Indiana in August 1919 to accept a position as the head of the department of physical education at Northwestern.  Evans suffered a nervous breakdown in September 1924 and died of a heart attack in November 1924.

References

External links
 Dana Evans at College Basketball at Sports-Reference.com

1874 births
1924 deaths
Boston University Terriers baseball players
Boston University Terriers football players
Beloit Buccaneers athletic directors
Beloit Buccaneers baseball coaches
Beloit Buccaneers football coaches
Beloit Buccaneers men's basketball coaches
Cornell Big Red men's basketball coaches
Cornell Big Red wrestling coaches
Indiana Hoosiers men's basketball coaches
Northwestern Wildcats athletic directors
Northwestern Wildcats men's basketball coaches
College men's gymnastics coaches in the United States
Indiana Hoosiers track and field coaches